Hemilissa violascens is a species of beetle in the family Cerambycidae. It was described by Perty in 1832.

References

Piezocerini
Beetles described in 1832